is a Japanese television jidaigeki or period drama that was broadcast in prime-time in 1976. It is 7th in the Hissatsu series. The drama is sequel to ''Hissatsu Shiokiya Kagyō'.

Plot

Cast
Atsuo Nakamura : Akai Kennosuke
Makoto Fujita : Mondo Nakamura
Shun Ōide: Yaitoya Mataemon
Mie Nakao : Ote
Atsushi Watanabe : Sutezō
Kin Sugai : Sen Nakamura
Mari Shiraki : Ritsu Nakamura

References

1976 Japanese television series debuts
1970s drama television series
Jidaigeki television series